Viola macloskeyi (small white violet, northern white violet, smooth white violet, sweet white violet, western sweet violet, western sweet-white violet, wild white violet) is a flowering perennial plant in the violet family (Violaceae).

It is native to Canada, the northeastern, north-central, northwestern, southeastern, and southwestern United States and California, and the French islands of Saint Pierre and Miquelon.

References

External links
 Jepson Manual Treatment
 Washington Burke Museum
 

macloskeyi
Flora of Subarctic America
Flora of Western Canada
Flora of Eastern Canada
Flora of the Northeastern United States
Flora of the Southeastern United States
Flora of the North-Central United States
Flora of the Northwestern United States
Flora of the Southwestern United States
Flora without expected TNC conservation status